James Walter Platz (25 June 1931 – 30 October 2019) was a Canadian sports shooter. He competed in the trap event at the 1972 Summer Olympics.

References

1931 births
2019 deaths
Canadian male sport shooters
Olympic shooters of Canada
Shooters at the 1972 Summer Olympics
Sportspeople from Saskatchewan
Pan American Games medalists in shooting
Pan American Games silver medalists for Canada
Shooters at the 1975 Pan American Games
20th-century Canadian people